The World Indoor Rowing Championships  is an indoor rowing championship competition organised by World Rowing. The competition has been held annually since 2018. So far, there have been championships organized in venues and with virtual formats.

Venues

Medallists

Men's

2000m

Lightweight 2000m

500m

Lightweight 500m

1 hour

Team

Women

2000m

Lightweight 2000m

500m

Lightweight 500m

1 hour

Team

Mixed

Team

References

 
 

Indoor
Recurring sporting events established in 2018
Indoor rowing competitions